Cretney is a surname. Notable people with the surname include:

David Cretney (born 1954), Manx politician and entrepreneur
Jonathan Cretney  (1879–1956), British footballer 
Ron Cretney, Manx politician
Stephen Cretney (1936–2019), British legal scholar
Thomas Grant Cretney (1870–1938), American politician and businessman